The Baptist Churches of New Zealand is a Baptist Christian denomination in New Zealand. It is affiliated with the Baptist World Alliance. The headquarters is in Auckland.

History

Several Baptists settled in New Zealand in the 1840s, but the first Baptist minister, Decimus Dolamore from Yorkshire, England, did not arrive until May 1851. Dolamore settled in Nelson and was involved in the formation of the first Baptist Church in New Zealand - Nelson Baptist Church - that same year. He was instrumental in obtaining a change in the law to allow Baptist ministers to perform marriage ceremonies; until 1854, only Catholic and Anglican priests were allowed to do so. Dolamore later went to Christchurch and was the first minister for that congregation.

The Canterbury Baptist Association was formed in 1874. This association started the New Zealand Baptist magazine, which has been published monthly since January 1881. The Baptist Union of New Zealand was formed at Wellington in October 1882. At that time, there were 22 Baptist churches, with 1,890 members. The New Zealand Baptist Missionary Society was formed at the 1885 conference of the Baptist Union. At the 1891 conference, the Union established a plan to divide the country into four districts - "Otago/Southland" (org. 1892), "Auckland" (org. 1892), "Canterbury & Westland" (org. 1892), and "Central" (org. 1896). Central District was later divided into the Central District Association and the "Wellington" Association, and "South Auckland" was formed in 1939. South Auckland was later divided into the "Waikato" Association and the "Bay of Plenty" Association (now Bay of Plenty & Eastland). The "Top of the South" Association was formed in 1990. Some groups were called "auxiliary" and some "association", but in 1957, the term "auxiliary" was dropped in favor of the term "association". There are currently 9 associations.

According to a denomination census released in 2020, it claimed 243 churches and 21,284 members.

Beliefs
Theologically, the Baptist Union member churches are deeply influenced by the charismatic renewal movement, though there is no official position regarding the movement.  A study in 1989 indicated that 69% of churches belonging to the Baptist Union identified with the charismatic movement.  A smaller portion of member churches are Reformed in doctrine.

Education
The Union supports education through Carey Baptist College in Penrose, Auckland, and Te Whare Amorangi, designed for Māori men and women, in Papatoetoe, Auckland. The Baptist National Centre is the registered office of the Baptist Union of New Zealand, the New Zealand Baptist Missionary Society and Baptist Care Limited, and is located in Penrose.

Prominent New Zealand Baptists
Decimus Dolamore - first Baptist minister in New Zealand
Thomas Spurgeon - successful evangelist and son of famous English Baptist preacher, Charles Haddon Spurgeon
Charles Dallaston - "the Father of the Baptist Union"
John James North - the first principal of the New Zealand Baptist Theological College
Hopestill Pillow - Baptist Missionary in the Zenana Missions to India.
Charles Henry Carter (29 October 1828 – 6 July 1914) - a Baptist missionary to Ceylon. Literary Works - Translations. Carter translated directly from the Greek and Hebrew texts, rather than the English. The Sinhalese work was done in vernacular language, that it could embody the message in a dialect that was understood by the people everywhere. His works include:
Sinhalese New Testament 1855
Sinhalese Book of Psalms 1863
Sinhalese Old Testament 1869
English – Sinhalese Dictionary 1881
Sinhalese – English Dictionary 1889
Towards the end of his life, Carter became Pastor of the Ponsonby Baptist Church in New Zealand. He was the first president of the Baptist Union of New Zealand.
Bishop Coppelstone, Anglican Primate of India is said to have described Carter as the "foremost Sinhalese scholar of this age".

See also
 Bible
 Born again
 Baptist beliefs
 Worship service (evangelicalism)
 Jesus Christ
 Believers' Church

References

Further reading
A Handful of Grain: The Centenary History of the Baptist Union of New Zealand (Volumes 1-4), by Paul Tonson, J. Ayson Clifford, G. T. Beilby, & S. L. Edgar
Baptists Around the World, by Albert W. Wardin Jr.
The Baptist Heritage: Four Centuries of Baptist Witness, by H. Leon McBeth

External links
 Official Website

Baptist denominations in Oceania
Evangelicalism in New Zealand
Religious organizations established in 1882
Baptist Christianity in New Zealand